Somdy Duangdy (born 1952) is a Laotian economist and politician. He has been Minister of Finance of Laos from 2007 to 2011, and again from 2016. He was born in Savannakhet Province in 1952. He was Minister of Planning and Investment from 2012 to 2016.

References

Members of the 9th Central Committee of the Lao People's Revolutionary Party
Members of the 10th Central Committee of the Lao People's Revolutionary Party
Lao People's Revolutionary Party politicians
Laotian economists
Deputy Prime Ministers of Laos
Finance Ministers of Laos
Government ministers of Laos
Living people
1952 births